, better known as  is a Japanese actress and politician who is represented by the talent agency, Wonder Production. In 2015, she was elected to the Kunitachi Municipal Assembly.

Filmography

TV series

Films

References

External links
 
Profile at Speakers.jp 

Japanese actresses
1958 births
Living people
People from Tokyo
Japanese actor-politicians